The quantum Fisher information is a central quantity in quantum metrology and is the quantum analogue of the classical Fisher information. The quantum Fisher information  of a state  with respect to the observable  is defined as

When the observable generates a unitary transformation of the system with a parameter  from initial state , 

the quantum Fisher information constrains the achievable precision in statistical estimation of the parameter  via the quantum Cramér–Rao bound as

where  is the number of independent repetitions.

It is often desirable to estimate the magnitude of an unknown parameter  that controls the strength of a system's Hamiltonian  with respect to a known observable  during a known dynamical time .

Connection with Fisher information

Quantum Fisher information is the supremum of the classical Fisher information over all such observables,

Relation to the Symmetric Logarithmic Derivative

Symmetric Logarithmic Derivative.

Equivalent expressions

For a unitary encoding operation , the quantum Fisher information can be computed as an integral,

where  on the right hand side denotes commutator.
It can be also expressed in terms of Kronecker product and vectorization,

where  denotes complex conjugate, and  denotes conjugate transpose. This formula holds for invertible density matrices. For non-invertible density matrices, the inverse above is substituted by the Moore-Penrose pseudoinverse. Density matrix  can be, for example,  in a finite-dimensional system, or a thermal state in infinite dimensional systems.

Generalization and relations to Bures metric and quantum fidelity

For any differentiable parametrization of the density matrix  by a vector of parameters , the quantum Fisher information matrix is defined as

where  denotes partial derivative with respect to parameter . The formula also holds without taking the real part , because the imaginary part leads to an antisymmetric contribution that disappears under the sum. Note that all eigenvalues  and eigenvectors  of the density matrix potentially depend on the vector of parameters .

This definition is identical to four times the Bures metric, up to singular points where the rank of the density matrix changes (those are the points at which  suddenly becomes zero.) Through this relation, it also connects with quantum fidelity  of two infinitesimally close states,

where the inner sum goes over all  at which eigenvalues . The extra term (which is however zero in most applications) can be avoided by taking a symmetric expansion of fidelity,

For  and unitary encoding, the quantum Fisher information matrix reduces to the original definition. 

Quantum Fisher information matrix is a part of a wider family of quantum statistical distances.

Relation to fidelity susceptibility

Assuming that  is a ground state of a parameter-dependent non-degenerate Hamiltonian , four times the quantum Fisher information of this state is called fidelity susceptibility, and denoted

Fidelity susceptibility measures the sensitivity of the ground state to the parameter, and its divergence indicates a quantum phase transition.

Convexity properties

The quantum Fisher information equals four times the variance for pure states

.

For mixed states, when the probabilities are parameter independent, i.e., when , the quantum Fisher information is convex:

The quantum Fisher information is the largest function that is convex and that equals four times the variance for pure states.
That is, it equals four times the convex roof of the variance <ref 

where the infimum is over all decompositions of the density matrix

Note that  are not necessarily orthogonal to each other. The above optimization can be rewritten as an optimization over the two-copy space as 

such that
 is a symmetric separable state and 

When the probabilities are -dependent, an extended-convexity relation has been proved:

where  is the classical Fisher information associated to the probabilities contributing to the convex decomposition. The first term, in the right hand side of the above inequality, can be considered as the average quantum Fisher information of the density matrices in the convex decomposition.

Inequalities for composite systems

We need to understand the behavior of quantum Fisher information in composite system in order to study quantum metrology of many-particle systems.
For product states,

holds.

For the reduced state, we have

where .

Relation to entanglement 
There are strong links between quantum metrology and quantum information science. For a multiparticle system of  spin-1/2 particles 

holds for separable states, where

The maximum for general quantum states is given by

 Hence, quantum entanglement is needed to reach the maximum precision in quantum metrology.

Moreover, for quantum states with an entanglement depth ,

Hence, a higher and higher levels of multipartite entanglement is needed to achieve a better and better accuracy in parameter estimation. It is possible to obtain a weaker but simpler bound 

 

Hence, a lower bound on the entanglement depth is obtained as

Relation to the Wigner–Yanase skew information

The Wigner–Yanase skew information is defined as 

It follows that  is convex in 

For the quantum Fisher information and the Wigner–Yanase skew information, the inequality

holds, where there is an equality for pure states.

Relation to the variance

holds, where both inequalities are tight. That is, there is a decomposition for which the second inequality is saturated, which is the same as stating that the quantum Fisher information is the convex roof of the variance over four, discussed above. There is also a decomposition for which the first inequality is saturated, which means that
the variance is its own concave roof

Uncertainty relations with the quantum Fisher information and the variance

Knowing that the quantum Fisher information is the convex roof of the variance times four, we obtain the relation 

which is stronger than the Heisenberg uncertainty relation. For a particle of spin- the following uncertainty relation holds

where  are angular momentum components. The relation can be strengthened as

References

Quantum information science
Quantum optics